Ivy League is an NCAA Division I athletic conference formed from eight schools in the northeastern US and a name for the schools as a group.

Ivy League can also refer to:

Ivy League Records, a record label
The Ivy League (band), a 1960s British pop trio
Ivy League (clothes), a clothing style
Ivy League (haircut), a short style of haircut for men